Quentin Martin (born 7 March 1996) is a French professional footballer who plays as a defender for Villefranche.

Club career
On 25 June 2021, he joined Villefranche.

References

Living people
1996 births
Association football defenders
French footballers
Ligue 2 players
Championnat National players
Championnat National 2 players
AS Béziers (2007) players
Football Bourg-en-Bresse Péronnas 01 players
Canet Roussillon FC players
FC Villefranche Beaujolais players